Who I Am is the first album by singer Amy Pearson released by Sony BMG in Australia on 19 April 2008 (see 2008 in music). Although the album was planned for release in November 2007, it had been pushed back due to the releases of Delta Goodrem's and Kylie Minogue's albums during the same time.  However the album was released in China around the original release date. It has so far released 3 singles in Australia without the help of the album release, "Don't Miss You", "Not Me" and "Ready to Fly". All three have received moderate airtime on Australian mainstream radio stations.

Promotion
In 2007 to promote Don't Miss You, Pearson performed on Channel 7's hit breakfast show Sunrise. She also performed Ready To Fly at It Takes Two finale earlier this year. She has also attended interviews in children shows such as channel 10's Toasted TV, later performing a shortened acoustic version of Ready To Fly with host Dan Sweetman, and channel 7's Saturday Disney. With the release of her album she performed at Westfield Parramatta singing songs and signing copies of Who I Am The song Now and For Always featured in the Korean reality show We Got Married on 6 July 2008.

Singles
"Don't Miss You": On 22 June 2007, the song was released on CD single, and was quickly acclaimed by the public. It peaked at #19 on the ARIA Singles Chart after several weeks, and was the 89th best selling single of 2007.
"Not Me": Released as the second single in November 2007, the song was snapped up by radio stations quickly and played usually, as the "Screw You" remix. It peaked at #37 on The ARIA Singles Chart.
"Ready To Fly": Released as the third single on 8 April' to coincide with the Beijing Olympics, as the official song. It peaked at #40 on the ARIA Singles Chart. It was popular on the radio, and was remixed with Guitars, to give it a more edgy sound.

Chart performance
Who I Am debuted on the ARIA Albums Chart at #39 on its first week of charting, and although it only stayed on the top 50 for one week, it remained on the top one hundred for four weeks. It also managed a peak of eleven on the Australasian Albums Chart and number thirty-eight on the Physical Albums Chart.

Track listing

Charts

Release history

References

2008 debut albums
Amy Pearson albums
Albums produced by DNA Songs
Sony Music Australia albums